Moringua macrocephalus is an eel in the family Moringuidae (spaghetti/worm eels). It was described by Pieter Bleeker in 1863, originally under the genus Aphthalmichthys. It is a subtropical, freshwater eel which is known from rivers in the east and south China Sea. It typically dwells in river mouths and mud flats. Males can reach a maximum standard length of 36.5 centimetres.

References

Moringuidae
Fish described in 1863